Reuben LaVell Edwards (October 11, 1930 – December 29, 2016) was an American football head coach for Brigham Young University (BYU).  With 257 career victories, he ranks as one of the most successful college football coaches of all time.  Among his many notable accomplishments, Edwards guided BYU to a national championship in 1984 and coached Heisman Trophy winner Ty Detmer in 1990.  

Edwards played football for Utah State University and earned a master's degree prior to coaching at BYU, where he also earned his doctorate.

Coaching career
Edwards was BYU's head football coach from 1972 to 2000. He had previously served as an assistant coach from 1962 to 1971.  His offensive scheme was passing-dominated. He started coaching in an era when college football offenses were dominated by strong running attacks. His quarterbacks threw over 11,000 passes for more than 100,000 yards and 635 touchdowns. He got the idea to switch to a pass oriented team by looking at BYU's history. The BYU football program had struggled before Edwards with the notable exception of one conference championship that resulted from the aerial attack of Virgil Carter. This past success encouraged Edwards to open up the BYU offense.

Edwards coached prominent quarterbacks such as Steve Young, Jim McMahon, Ty Detmer, Marc Wilson, Robbie Bosco, Gary Scheide, Gifford Nielsen and Steve Sarkisian.

Awards won by his players include a Heisman Trophy, a Doak Walker Award, a Maxwell Award, two Outland Trophies, four Davey O'Brien Awards, seven Sammy Baugh Awards, 34 All-America citations (including 10 consensus All-Americans), 11 conference player of the year and  24 Academic All-America player citations.

In 1984, he was named National Coach of the Year after BYU finished the season 13–0 and won the National Championship. Edwards retired after the 2000 season with a 257–101–3 record.

Prior to Edwards' final game, BYU renamed its home field, Cougar Stadium, as LaVell Edwards Stadium in his honor. The stadium had almost doubled in his capacity during his tenure, from 35,000 people when he took over the program to over 65,000 people upon his retirement.

At the time of his retirement, he ranked sixth all-time in victories, and second all-time in victories with a single program (behind only Joe Paterno at Penn State). Edwards received the Amos Alonzo Stagg Award, presented by the American Football Coaches Association, in 2003.

In the 1980 Holiday Bowl, BYU rallied from a 45–25 deficit with only 4 minutes to play to defeat Southern Methodist University (SMU).

Following the 1984 national championship, Edwards was offered head coaching positions with the Detroit Lions and the University of Texas at Austin, but he turned down both offers.

Accomplishments
 
22nd on NCAA all-time list for coaching victories (257)
Member of the College Football Hall of Fame
Coached 6 all-American quarterbacks
His teams led the nation in passing offense 8 times
His teams led the nation in total offense 5 times
His teams led the nation in scoring offense 3 times

Coaching tree
Dick Felt, former BYU assistant athletic director / assistant head coach / defensive coordinator / defensive backfield coach (BYU defensive back / running back / punter)
Mike Holmgren, former Seattle Seahawks & Green Bay Packers head coach, Cleveland Browns president of operations (BYU quarterbacks coach)
Steve Sarkisian, University of Texas head coach & former University of Southern California head coach (BYU quarterback)
Norm Chow, former Hawaii head coach (BYU offensive coordinator)
Dave Kragthorpe, former Oregon State head coach, father of Steve Kragthorpe (BYU offensive line coach)
Kyle Whittingham, Utah head coach (BYU linebacker)
Fred Whittingham, longtime NFL and college assistant coach (BYU defensive coordinator)
Robert Anae, NC State offensive coordinator (BYU offensive lineman)
Brian Billick, former NFL head coach (BYU tight end / graduate assistant)
Ted Tollner, former USC head coach (BYU offensive coordinator)
Doug Scovil, former SDSU head coach (BYU offensive coordinator)
Brandon Doman, former BYU offensive coordinator (BYU quarterback)
Tom Holmoe, BYU athletic director & former Cal head coach (BYU defensive back)
Andy Reid, Kansas City Chiefs head coach (BYU lineman / graduate assistant)
Charlie Stubbs, Louisville offensive coordinator (BYU graduate assistant)
Kalani Sitake, BYU head coach, (BYU running back, graduate assistant)
Ty Detmer, BYU offensive coordinator, (BYU quarterback / Heisman Trophy winner)
Gary Crowton, former Louisiana Tech and BYU head coach (BYU Graduate Assistant)

Head coaching record

Source: LaVell Edwards Coaching Record

Personal life
While head football coach at BYU, Edwards also earned a doctorate. 

Following his retirement from coaching, Edwards remained a prominent leader and speaker for members of the Church of Jesus Christ of Latter-day Saints (LDS Church), which owns and operates BYU. He and his wife served an 18-month mission for the LDS Church in New York City during 2002 and 2003.

Death
Edwards suffered a broken hip on December 24, 2016, and died five days later at his home in Provo on December 29, at the age of 86. A public memorial service was held at the Utah Valley Convention Center in Provo on January 6, 2017. A private funeral service for family and friends was then held the next day, on January 7.

See also
 Legends Poll
 List of presidents of the American Football Coaches Association
 List of college football coaches with 200 wins

References

External links
 
 BYU Hall of Fame profile
 BYU profile (2000)
 

1930 births
2016 deaths
21st-century Mormon missionaries
American football offensive linemen
American Mormon missionaries in the United States
BYU Cougars football coaches
Utah State Aggies football players
High school football coaches in Utah
College Football Hall of Fame inductees
Brigham Young University alumni
Sportspeople from Orem, Utah
Coaches of American football from Utah
Players of American football from Utah
Latter Day Saints from Utah